Carl-Johan Emanuel Vallgren (born 26 July 1964, in Linköping) is a Swedish author, singer and musician. He won the August Prize in 2002 for the novel The Horrific Sufferings of the Mind-Reading Monster Hercules Barefoot.

Personal life
Vallgren is of Finnish descent through his mother who was sent to Sweden as a Finnish war child during World War II.

Bibliography
Nomaderna (1987)
Längta bort (1988)
Fågelkvinnan (1990)
Berättelser om sömn och vaka (1994)
Dokument rörande spelaren Rubashov (1996)
För herr Bachmanns broschyr (1998)
Berlin på 8 kapitel (1999)
The Horrific Sufferings of the Mind-Reading Monster Hercules Barefoot (2002)
Kunzelmann och Kunzelmann (2009)
Havsmannen (2012)
 Sviven, Eng: The Tunnel
 Skuggpojken, (2014) Eng: The Boy in the Shadows (2015)
 The Merman (2017)

References

1964 births
Living people
People from Linköping
20th-century Swedish novelists
Writers from Östergötland
Swedish male novelists
August Prize winners
Swedish people of Finnish descent